Alfred Reynolds may refer to:

 Alfred Reynolds (writer) (1907–1993), writer on social and religious topics
 Alfred Reynolds (composer) (1884–1969), composer of light music for the theatre
 Alfred Reynolds (politician), Australian politician